Live in Las Vegas Vol. 2 is the second live album by American pop duo Sonny & Cher, released in December 1973 by Kapp/MCA Records.

Album information
It was released in December 1973, entered the Billboard Top 200 Album Chart on December 22, 1973, and reached #175 on the Billboard album charts.

This was their third double album after 1968's Sonny & Cher's Greatest Hits and 1972's The Two of Us. The album is largely a collection of cover songs including "I Can See Clearly Now" (originally by Johnny Nash) and "Where You Lead" (originally by Carole King).
No singles were released from the album. The songs "Bang Bang (My Baby Shot Me Down)" and "You Better Sit Down Kids" were performed by Bono; both were written by Bono and performed by Cher in the late 60s. Cher also sings "Gypsies, Tramps And Thieves" as a solo.

Track listing

Side A
"All I Ever Need is You" (Eddie Reeves, Jimmy Holiday) - 3:06
Music Medley & Dialogue: - 3:09
"I Can See Clearly Now" (Johnny Nash) - 1:57
"You've Got a Friend" (Carole King) - 3:09
"Where You Lead" (Carole King, Toni Stern) - 1:49
"You've Got a Friend (Reprise)" (Carole King) - 0:49

Side B
Comedy Monologue" - 3:24
"Gypsies, Tramps and Thieves" (Bob Stone) - 2:25
"Brother Love's Travelling Salvation Show" (Neil Diamond) - 3:39
"You and I" (Stevie Wonder) - 5:00

Side C
"Superstar" (Leon Russell, Bonnie Bramlett) - 5:14
Monologue - 4:02
"Bang Bang (My Baby Shot Me Down)" (Sonny Bono) - 6:20

Side D
"You Better Sit Down Kids"/"A Cowboy's Work is Never Done" (Sonny Bono) - 10:34
Band Introduction - 2:57
"I Got You Babe" (Sonny Bono) - 2:59

Charts

Personnel
Cher - vocals
Sonny Bono - vocals
David Paich - conductor, piano, organ
David Hungate - bass
Jeff Porcaro - drums
Dan Ferguson - guitar
Dean Parks - guitar
Jack Eglash Orchestra - house band
Technical
Lenny Roberts - engineer
Wally Heider - equipment
Thor - photography

Production
Producer: Denis Pregnolato

References

Sonny & Cher albums
1974 live albums
MCA Records live albums
Albums recorded at SLS Las Vegas